
Gmina Byczyna is an urban-rural gmina (administrative district) in Kluczbork County, Opole Voivodeship, in south-western Poland.

Villages
Apart from the town of Byczyna, Gmina Byczyna contains the villages and settlements of Biskupice, Borek, Chudoba, Ciecierzyn, Dobiercice, Gołkowice, Gosław, Jakubowice, Janówka, Jaśkowice, Kochłowice, Kostów, Miechowa, Nasale, Paruszowice, Pogorzałka, Polanowice, Proślice, Pszczonki, Roszkowice, Sarnów, Sierosławice and Wojsławice.

Neighbouring gminas
Gmina Byczyna is bordered by the gminas of Bolesławiec, Gorzów Śląski, Kluczbork, Łęka Opatowska, Łubnice, Trzcinica and Wołczyn.

Twin towns – sister cities

Gmina Byczyna is twinned with:
 Csókakő, Hungary

References

Byczyna
Kluczbork County